"Democracy sausage" is the colloquial name for a sausage wrapped in a slice of bread, bought from a sausage sizzle operated as a fundraiser at Australian polling places on election day, often in aid of the institutions that house the polling place.  In 2016, the BBC reported that just under one-third of the 1,992 polling booths across Australia had a sausage stand by the count of the Election Sausage Sizzles website.

CNN quoted historian Judith Brett, author of From Secret Ballot to Democracy Sausage: How Australia Got Compulsory Voting as saying "Certainly, there's a photo in the 1930s of a polling booth with a cake stall outside, so I think community organizations saw it was an opportunity to fund-raise."  Brett is further quoted as saying that sausages started appearing in the early 1980s when portable barbecue grills became available. The first use of the phrase "democracy sausage" on social media was in the lead-up to the 2013 Western Australian state election, but the phrase was probably in spoken use before then.

The democracy sausage has become so well recognised in Australian culture, that in the 24 hours leading up to the 2 July 2016 federal election Twitter changed its emoji for #ausvotes from a ballot box to a sausage lying on a slice of white bread topped with sauce. In December 2016 the Australian National Dictionary Centre selected "democracy sausage" as its Australian Word of the Year for 2016.

As Australians always vote on a Saturday and voting is compulsory, there is always high voter turnout for both state and federal elections. Many polling places are located at schools, community halls and churches, with these groups often taking advantage of the large number of people coming to their location by setting up fundraising stalls. For many community groups this is the biggest fundraising event of the year.

Variations on the standard sausage in bread are also available at some election day stalls. Voters can also purchase vegan, vegetarian, or gluten-free alternatives as well as other food items, including cakes and drinks. Various websites and social media accounts have been set up to help the public locate which polling booths have stalls and what will be available at them, so that they can choose a polling location according to their food choices. At the 2 July 2016 federal election, one such site recorded 2301 polling booths as having sausages and/or cakes available, and another recorded 2094, each of which is over one-third of the total number.

Some cake stalls sell themed sweets which are named as a play on politicians' names such as Alba-Cheesy Cakes (Anthony Albanese), Malcolm Turnovers, Malcolm Turnballs (Malcolm Turnbull), Plebislice (referring to a plebiscite), Jacqui Lambingtons (Jacqui Lambie), Tanya Plibiscuits (Tanya Plibersek), and Richard Di Nutella Fudge (Richard Di Natale).

See also

Politics of Australia

References

External links
 ElectionSausageSizzle.com.au
 DemocracySausage.org
 

Elections in Australia
Australian cuisine
Fundraising events
Sausage dishes
Australian sausages